is a fictional village in the 1996 Pokémon Red and Blue video games. Stylized as a haunted location, Lavender Town is home to the Pokémon Tower, a burial ground for deceased Pokémon and a location to find Ghost-Type Pokémon.

The background music of Lavender Town is renowned for adding to the town's creepy atmosphere and in 2010, it gave rise to the 'Lavender Town Syndrome' creepypasta, a fictional story about hundreds of Japanese children committing suicide after listening to the track.

In the games
Lavender Town is a village that can be visited in Pokémon Red, Green, Blue, Yellow, and sequels Gold, Silver, Crystal, and the remakes thereof. A departure from the typical joyous tone of Red, Green, Blue, and Yellow, it is home to the "Pokémon Tower", a graveyard filled with mourning trainers and hundreds of tombstones for deceased Pokémon. There the player character can come across the ghost-type Pokémon Gastly and Haunter. The tower is the only place where they are available for capture. During the story of Red, Green, Blue, and Yellow, the player will utilise the item Silph Scope to deal with the ghost-type Pokémon. It is implied that the village is haunted by the spirit of dead Pokémon, in particular a Marowak—murdered by the villainous Team Rocket—searching for its orphaned-Cubone. This story is expanded on in the remake Pokémon: Let's Go, Pikachu! and Let's Go, Eevee! Lavender Town is the player's first encounter with the concept of Pokémon dying. It's one of a few towns in the Kanto region not to feature a gym.

The Pokémon Tower was replaced by the "Kanto Radio Tower" in Pokémon Gold and Silver. Lavender Town is also home to the "Name Rater", which allows players to change the nickname of their Pokémon, and a care home for abandoned Pokémon.

The Pokémon Tower appears in the episode "The Tower of Terror", the 23rd episode from the first season of the Pokémon anime series, when Ash, Misty, and Brock search for ghost-type Pokémon for the Gym battle against Sabrina. Lavender Town also appears in the Pokémon Adventures and The Electric Tale of Pikachu manga series.

Music

The chiptune background music of Lavender Town in Pokémon Red, Blue, Green and Yellow versions has garnered much interest due to some listeners finding it unsettling. Listing it as the second-most scary video game track in 2012, Brittany Vincent of Bloody Disgusting stated that Lavender Town's "deceptively calm ... tune ranks highly on most gamers' lists of terrifying childhood memories." Lavender Town's music, composed by Junichi Masuda, is deliberately atonal and combines sharp chiptune sounds with "a cavalcade of jarring chords" to create an eerie atmosphere. Shubhankar Parijat of GamingBolt included the song on their list of creepy soundtracks in non-horror games. Jay Hathaway of Gawker stated that leaving the music on loop may cause a "vague sense of dread". Kevin Knezevic of GameSpot called it "one of the area's most unforgettable features".

In Pokémon Gold, Silver and Crystal versions (and in their remakes Pokémon HeartGold and SoulSilver), the Lavender Town theme music was recomposed to a happier tone as, per the game's storyline, the Pokémon Tower was demolished and replaced with the Kanto Radio Tower. On YouTube many remixes of the theme have been made. It was re-recorded for the 2017, 2019, and 2020 Pokémon Go Halloween event.

Lavender Town Syndrome

In the early 2010s, an urban legend claimed that hundreds of Japanese children had committed suicide in the 1990s as a result of the music in the game, speculating that high pitched tones and binaural beats caused headaches and erratic behavior that led to their deaths. A fabricated illness was dubbed "Lavender Town Syndrome" (as well as "Lavender Town Tone, Lavender Town Conspiracy, and Lavender Town Suicides") and the original story went viral after a creepypasta version of the story was spread on websites such as 4chan. Various people have added details to make the story more convincing over time, such as photoshopping images of ghosts and the Pokémon Unown (spelling out the message "leave now") into spectrogram outputs of the Lavender Town music. Certain versions claim that the games’ director, Satoshi Tajiri, wanted the tone in the game to "annoy" children instead of cause harm, while others claim Nintendo was in collaboration with the Japanese government.

Reception 
Jessie Coello of TheGamer described the story as "one of the creepiest and most infamous creepypastas in online fiction." Mark Hill of Kill Screen stated that the appeal of the Lavender Town Syndrome legend "comes from corrupting such an innocent symbol of childhood." Patricia Hernandez of Kotaku believed that one of the reasons why the Lavender Town creepypasta "is so effective" is that the theme tune is "genuinely creepy." She also noted that the suicides taking place in Japan was an important element in preserving the mystery as fact-checking would require proficiency in Japanese. Nadia Oxford of Lifewire drew comparisons with "Dennō Senshi Porygon", an episode of the Pokémon anime series that gave hundreds of Japanese viewers, most of them children, reactions similar to epilepsy symptoms and sent some into seizures, stating that its fallout "provides a solid bedrock for the Lavender Town myth." Scott Baird of TheGamer believed that the story was "clearly inspired" by the event. Matt Rooney of IGN selected it as one of the best video game urban legends.

Reception and legacy
Eurogamer described Lavender Town as a "standout location" in the original Pokémon games, as it is one of the few locations in the franchise that deals with the fact that the "cute and cuddly" Pokémon could actually die. Rani Baker, writing for Grunge, speculated that this "revelation" is why so many were affected by it. Cian Maher of Bloody Disgusting called the setting "infamous" – "uncanny, weird, and deeply unsettling." He praised the reinvented take in Pokémon: Let's Go, Pikachu! and Let's Go, Eevee!. James Troughton of TheGamer called it "one of the darkest areas of the series" while Jessie Coello, stated that it "birthed some of the most disturbing lore tied to the franchise." Patricia Hernandez wrote that "I can’t think of a single thing in Pokémon more unsettling than Lavender Town." Caroline O’Donoghue of The Guardian singled out Lavender Town as an example of the Pokémon series unique, "half-written, euphemistic" style of story-telling.

In 2018, a line of merchandise was made about Lavender Town.

References

Further reading
 Manzinali, Eymeric. "“Lavender Town Syndrome” Creepypasta: A Rational Narration of the Supernatural". In: Disenchantment, Re-Enchantment and Folklore Genres. Edited by Nemanja Radulović and Smiljana Đorđević Belić. Belgrade: Institute for Literature and Arts, 2021. pp. 217-236.

Fictional elements introduced in 1996
Fictional populated places
Pokémon
Video game locations